Greenfield Township, Ohio, may refer to:

Greenfield Township, Fairfield County, Ohio
Greenfield Township, Gallia County, Ohio
Greenfield Township, Huron County, Ohio

Ohio township disambiguation pages